Open trial may refer to:

Public trial
Open-label trial, a type of clinical trial that is not blinded